Subic International Raceway was a racing circuit at the Subic Freeport Zone in the Philippines. It was built in 1993, through the efforts of famed race car driver Pocholo Ramirez.

History
The eruption of Mount Pinatubo in 1991 led to the United States abandoning their base in Subic. The Subic International Raceway was established at the site of the former Naval Air Station Cubi Point's refuelling area for fighter jets. Former Filipino race car driver Pocholo Ramirez with the help of other figures in Philippine racing including Mandy Eduque, Mike Potenciano, Macky Carapiet, Louis Camus, Freddy Masigan set up Sports Values Incorporated (SVI) so that they could convert the existing paved roads and taxiways into a racing circuit.

The Subic International Raceway was opened in 1994 with SVI initially only able to secure a three month lease for the racing circuit's site. The lease was extended multiple times during the racing circuit's 17-year operation.

It gained approval from the Fédération Internationale de Motocyclisme (FIM) in 1997 and secured a grade four Fédération Internationale de l'Automobile (FIA) license in 1998 which certified the racing circuit's suitability for international automotive and motorcycle races including the Asian Touring Car Series and Formula 3 races. The racing circuit was also open to amateur racers.

Subic Bay has hosted South East Asia's Premier motorcycle, touring car and formula car events. The Marlboro Asia Pacific Road Racing Championship, Asian Festival of Speed (AFOS) featuring the Southeast Asian Touring Car Zone Challenge (SEATCZC) and the Asian Formula 2000 have all raced here, and it also hosts the Asian 1600 Touring Car Invitational Cup, the Philippine Japan Invitational Historic Car Races and the Hong Kong Classic Car Races. The major visitor to the track today is the Asian F3 Series.

The racing circuit closed in July 2010 with the three-day "The Last Lap" held as the last racing event.

Racing track
It had long straights that allowed for a long and short circuit setup.

Lap records

The official race lap records at the Subic International Raceway are listed as:

References

Defunct motorsport venues
Motorsport venues in the Philippines
Buildings and structures in Bataan
1994 establishments in the Philippines
Sports venues completed in 1994
Subic Special Economic and Freeport Zone